The 2018–19 season was Udinese Calcio's 39th season in Serie A and their 24th consecutive season in the top-flight. The club competed in Serie A, finishing 12th, and the Coppa Italia, where they were eliminated in the third round.

Spanish coach Julio Velázquez was appointed to manage the club on 7 June, replacing former Juventus player and Croatia international Igor Tudor, who left the club after only one month in charge. However, Velázquez would be sacked 13 November 2018 and replaced by former Crotone manager Davide Nicola.

Players

Squad information
Last updated on 26 May 2019
Appearances include league matches only

Transfers

In

Loans in

Out

Loans out

Competitions

Serie A

League table

Results summary

Results by round

Matches

Coppa Italia

Statistics

Appearances and goals

|-
! colspan=14 style=background:#dcdcdc; text-align:center| Goalkeepers

|-
! colspan=14 style=background:#dcdcdc; text-align:center| Defenders

|-
! colspan=14 style=background:#dcdcdc; text-align:center| Midfielders

|-
! colspan=14 style=background:#dcdcdc; text-align:center| Forwards

|-
! colspan=14 style=background:#dcdcdc; text-align:center| Players transferred out during the season

Goalscorers

Last updated: 26 May 2019

Clean sheets

Last updated: 26 May 2019

Disciplinary record

Last updated: 26 May 2019

References

Udinese Calcio seasons
Udinese